Eduardo Mora Hernández, known simply as Lalo Mora, (born January 24, 1947, in Los Ramones, Nuevo León) is a Mexican norteño singer.

Beginnings 
Lalo Mora was born in Los Ramones, Nuevo León, on January 24, 1947, under the name Eduardo Mora Hernández. He started singing in bars and was soon known around his hometown, where he made a duet known as Lupe y Lalo.

Career 
In 1980 he formed the famous group Los Invasores de Nuevo León. He had many great hits, including "Mi Casa Nueva" and "Laurita Garza" In 1993 he decides to pursue a solo career and becomes a successful singer in his own right.

In 2020 he confirmed that he acquired the COVID-19 virus, but is now stable.

References

Mexican male singers
Living people
Norteño musicians
Singers from Nuevo León
1947 births